This is a list of Major League Soccer drafts.  Types of Major League Soccer drafts include the MLS SuperDraft, the MLS Supplemental Draft and the MLS Expansion Draft.

Inaugural Draft
1996 MLS Inaugural Allocations
1996 MLS Inaugural Player Draft

College Drafts

1996 MLS College Draft
1997 MLS College Draft
1998 MLS College Draft
1999 MLS College Draft

Supplemental Drafts

1996 MLS Supplemental Draft
1997 MLS Supplemental Draft
1998 MLS Supplemental Draft
1999 MLS Supplemental Draft
2003 MLS Supplemental Draft
2005 MLS Supplemental Draft
2006 MLS Supplemental Draft
2007 MLS Supplemental Draft
2008 MLS Supplemental Draft
2011 MLS Supplemental Draft
2012 MLS Supplemental Draft
2013 MLS Supplemental Draft

SuperDrafts

 2000 MLS SuperDraft
 2001 MLS SuperDraft
 2002 MLS SuperDraft
 2003 MLS SuperDraft
 2004 MLS SuperDraft
 2005 MLS SuperDraft
 2006 MLS SuperDraft
 2007 MLS SuperDraft
 2008 MLS SuperDraft
 2009 MLS SuperDraft
 2010 MLS SuperDraft
 2011 MLS SuperDraft
 2012 MLS SuperDraft
 2013 MLS SuperDraft
 2014 MLS SuperDraft
 2015 MLS SuperDraft
 2016 MLS SuperDraft
 2017 MLS SuperDraft
 2018 MLS SuperDraft
 2019 MLS SuperDraft
 2020 MLS SuperDraft
 2021 MLS SuperDraft
 2022 MLS SuperDraft

Contraction Drafts
2002 MLS Allocation Draft
2002 MLS Dispersal Draft
2014 MLS Dispersal Draft

Expansion Drafts

1997 MLS Expansion Draft
2004 MLS Expansion Draft
2006 MLS Expansion Draft
2007 MLS Expansion Draft
2008 MLS Expansion Draft
2009 MLS Expansion Draft
2010 MLS Expansion Draft
2011 MLS Expansion Draft
2014 MLS Expansion Draft
2016 MLS Expansion Draft
2017 MLS Expansion Draft
2018 MLS Expansion Draft
2019 MLS Expansion Draft
2020 MLS Expansion Draft
2021 MLS Expansion Draft

Re-Entry Drafts

2010 MLS Re-Entry Draft
2011 MLS Re-Entry Draft
2012 MLS Re-Entry Draft
2013 MLS Re-Entry Draft
2014 MLS Re-Entry Draft
2015 MLS Re-Entry Draft
2016 MLS Re-Entry Draft
2017 MLS Re-Entry Draft
2018 MLS Re-Entry Draft
2019 MLS Re-Entry Draft
2020 MLS Re-Entry Draft
2021 MLS Re-Entry Draft

External links
MLS draft rules (see II.B., "SUPERDRAFT & SUPPLEMENTAL DRAFT")